Titanium(II) iodide is the inorganic compound with the formula TiI2.  It is a black micaceous solid.  It adopts the cadmium iodide structure, featuring octahedral Ti(II) centers.  It arises via the reaction of the elements:
Ti + I2  →  TiI2

As such, it is  an implied intermediate in the van Arkel–de Boer process for the purification of titanium metal.

References

Titanium(II) compounds
Iodides
Titanium halides